Tramore Valley Park is a park on the southside of Cork in Ireland. While parts of the park opened in mid-2015 (including for BMX and parkrun events), and had been targeted to open more completely during 2016, as of October 2018 the park had not been opened to the public on a broader scale or to larger events. The park was ultimately opened in May 2019, and is managed by the Glen Resource Centre on behalf of Cork City Council.

Development 

While parts of the park opened in mid-2015 (including a BMX track), and some events held in the park since September 2015 (including parkrun events), by late 2017, not all parts of the park had opened. While planned to open by mid-2016, by late-2018, access and parking issues had delayed the opening of the park on a broader scale or to larger events. Additional funding, to address these issues, was allocated in the Cork City Council budget for 2018, with a view to "open Tramore Valley Park [..] seven days a week before [summer 2018]". By late 2018 however it had been reported that at least a further €6m would be required "to provide full and safe access to the site", and that the opening would be delayed until 2019.

Following the opening of additional pedestrian entrances and the addition of 400 car parking spaces, the park was officially opened in May 2019, with further enhancements proposed "in the coming years".

After 6-year break, a weekly parkrun event returned to the park in July 2022.

Location 
The park boundaries are broadly triangular in shape, marked on the south-side of the site by the South Ring Road (N40), on the north-west by the South Link Road (N27), and on the north-east by housing estates off the South Douglas Road. Neighbouring suburbs include Douglas, Turner's Cross, Ballyphehane, Frankfield and Grange. As Grange lies across a busy dual-carriageway, planning consideration had been given to the provision of a pedestrian access bridge.

As of 2021, there were two access points to the park, with vehicular access from the N27 South Link Road (opposite the Black Ash Park and Ride), and pedestrian access via a walkway in Willow Park, Douglas. A second pedestrian access point at Half Moon Lane was included in the park's plans but, as of 2020, had not opened to the public or local residents. The works required to facilitate this entrance commenced in mid-2021, and it officially opened in 2022.

Electricity generation
When completed, it was expected that almost €40m would have been spent sealing off the rainwater waste and harvesting any gas produced by the former landfill. It had been planned to use this gas to generate 0.5MW of electricity - enough to power approximately 400 to 500 local homes.

In 2012, Cork City Council and Naturgy Energy announced the commencement of energy generation from reclaimed methane gas.

References

Geography of Cork (city)
Parks in Cork (city)